Until January 1, 2007 Ørbæk Municipality was a municipality (Danish: kommune) in the former Funen County, on the east coast of the island of Funen, in central Denmark.  The municipality covered an area of 138.34 km2, and had a total population of 6,916 (2006).  Its last mayor was Kaf Refslund, a member of the Venstre party.

Ørbæk Municipality bordered Nyborg and Ullerslev Municipality to the north, Årslev Municipality to the northwest, Ringe Municipality to the west, Ryslinge Municipality to the southwest and Gudme Municipality to the south.

The municipality ceased to exist as the result of Kommunalreformen 2007 (the Municipality Reform of 2007).  It was merged with Nyborg and Ullerslev municipalities to form a new Nyborg municipality. The new municipality belongs to Region of Southern Denmark.

History
In the Middle Ages, when Denmark was divided into hundreds, the area of Ørbæk Municipality were under the hundreds of Vindinge and Gudme. In 1662 counties were established, and Ørbæk came under Nyborg County. It merged with Tranekær County in 1793 to form Svendborg County. In the 1970 Danish Municipal Reform Svendborg County was merged with Odense County to form Funen County. After the 2007 municipal reform Funen County came under the Region of Southern Denmark.

From 1842, where parish municipalities were created, and until 1966 the area of Ørbæk Municipality consisted of seven parish municipalities. They were merged in 1966 to form Ørbæk Parish Municipality, which then became Ørbæk Municipality in the 1970 Municipal Reform.

In the Municipality Reform of 2007 Ørbæk Municipality was merged with Nyborg and Ullerslev Municipality to form a new Nyborg Municipality.

It was in 2005 suggested that Ørbæk should not only be merged with Nyborg and Ullerslev, but also with the municipalities of Munkebo, Langeskov and Kerteminde to create one large Eastern Funen municipality. The reason was that the new Kerteminde Municipality would have too small of a population to function properly. In the end, Nyborg and Kerteminde weren't merged and became two separate municipalities.

Historical divisions

Towns

Nearly half of the population of the municipality lived in small villages or rural areas. Approximately a fifth of the municipality's population lived in Ørbæk, which was the largest town in the municipality. The remaining population lived in the other five larger settlements in the municipality, these being Refsvindinge, Måre (including Herrested), Frørup, Tårup and Svindinge. Smaller villages in the municipality included Kullerup, Øksendrup, Tårup Strand and Langå.

Ørbæk was located centrally in the municipality, with Refsvindinge, Måre and Frørup spread out around Ørbæk. The town of Ørbæk is well known for its brewery. The brewery originate from 1906, and also acts as the headquarter for the Naturfrisk Group.

Below are the populations from 2006 of the six larger settlements of the municipality.

Politics

Municipal council
Below are the municipal council elected since the municipality's creation in 1970 and until 2001, which was the last election before the municipality was dissolved.

Mayors
Since the creation of the municipality in 1970 and until it was dissolved in 2007, the mayors of Ørbæk Municipality were:

Parishes

The municipality consisted of nine parishes and nine churches.
Ellested Parish (Ellested Church)
Frørup Parish (Frørup Church)
Herrested Parish (Herrested Church)
Kullerup Parish (Kullerup Church)
Langå Parish (Langå Church)
Refsvindinge Parish (Refsvindinge Church)
Svindinge Parish (Svindinge Church)
Øksendrup Parish (Øksendrup Church)
Ørbæk Parish (Ørbæk Church)

Symbols

Ørbæk Municipality's coat of arm was ten yellow church bells, placed in a reverse pyramid. The bells represented the churches of the municipality. The background was blue. The coat of arms was designed by Palle Aagaard and Henning Terndrup.

References 

Former municipalities of Denmark